The Negev or Negeb is a desert and semidesert region of southern Israel. The region's largest city and administrative capital is Beersheba (pop. ), in the north. At its southern end is the Gulf of Aqaba and the resort city and port of Eilat. It contains several development towns, including Dimona, Arad and Mitzpe Ramon, as well as a number of small Bedouin towns, including Rahat and Tel Sheva and Lakiya. There are also several kibbutzim, including Revivim and Sde Boker; the latter became the home of Israel's first Prime Minister, David Ben-Gurion, after his retirement from politics.

Although historically part of a separate region (known during the Roman period as Arabia Petraea), the Negev was added to the proposed area of Mandatory Palestine, of which large parts later became Israel, on 10 July 1922, having been conceded by British representative St John Philby "in Trans-Jordan's name". Despite this, the region remained exclusively Arab until 1946; in response to the British Morrison–Grady Plan which would have allotted the area to an Arab state, the Jewish Agency enacted the 11 points in the Negev plan to begin Jewish settlement in the area. A year later, the United Nations Partition Plan for Palestine allotted a larger part of the area to the Jewish State which became Israel.

The desert is home to the Ben-Gurion University of the Negev, whose faculties include the Jacob Blaustein Institutes for Desert Research and the Albert Katz International School for Desert Studies, both located on the Midreshet Ben-Gurion campus adjacent to Sde Boker.

In October 2012, global travel guide publisher Lonely Planet rated the Negev second on a list of the world's top ten regional travel destinations for 2013, noting its current transformation through development.

Etymology and other names
The origin of the word Negev is from the Hebrew root denoting 'dry'; in the Hebrew Bible, the word Negev is also used for the direction 'south'. Some English-language translations use the spelling Negeb.

The Negev mentioned in the Bible consisted only of the northernmost part of the modern Israeli Negev with, the semiarid Arad-Beersheba Valley defined as "the eastern (biblical) Negev".

In Arabic, the Negev is known as an-Naqab or an-Naqb ('the [mountain] pass'), though it was not thought of as a distinct region until the demarcation of the Egypt-Ottoman frontier in the 1890s and has no single Arabic name.

During the British Mandate, it was called "Beersheba sub-district".

Geography

The Negev contains the oldest discovered surface on Earth, with an approximate age of 1.8 million years. During the Pleistocene, the Negev fluctuated between intervals of relative humidity and intervals of aridity similar to or even more severe than the present day; from around 80,000 to 13,000 years BP, during a time interval roughly corresponding to the Last Glacial Period, the Negev was significantly more humid than today. It forms an inverted triangle shape whose western side is contiguous with the desert of the Sinai Peninsula, and whose eastern border is the Arabah valley. The Negev has a number of interesting cultural and geological features. Among the latter are three enormous, craterlike makhteshim (box canyons), which are unique to the region: Makhtesh Ramon, HaMakhtesh HaGadol, and HaMakhtesh HaKatan.

The Negev is a rocky desert. It is a melange of brown, rocky, dusty mountains interrupted by wadis (dry riverbeds that bloom briefly after rain) and deep craters. It can be split into five different ecological regions: northern, western and central Negev, the high plateau and the Arabah Valley. The northern Negev, or Mediterranean zone, receives  of rain annually and has fairly fertile soils. The western Negev receives  of rain per year, with light and partially sandy soils. Sand dunes can reach heights of up to  here. The area gets  of rain per year, with inferior and partially salty soils. The Arabah Valley along the Jordanian border stretches  from Eilat in the south to the tip of the Dead Sea in the north. The Arabah Valley is very arid with barely  of rain annually. It has inferior soils, in which little can grow without irrigation and special soil additives.

Flora and fauna

Vegetation in the Negev is sparse, but certain trees and plants thrive there, among them Acacia, Pistacia, Retama, Urginea maritima and Thymelaea. Hyphaene thebaica or doum palm can be found in the Southern Negev. The Evrona Nature Reserve is the most northerly point in the world where this palm can be found.

A small population of Arabian leopards, an endangered animal in the Arabian peninsula, survives in the southern Negev. Other carnivora found in the Negev are the caracal, the striped hyena, the Arabian wolf, the golden jackal and the marbled polecat.

The Arabah mountain gazelle survives with a few individuals in the Negev. The dorcas gazelle is more numerous, with some 1,000–1,500 individuals in the Negev. Some 350 to 500 Nubian ibex live in the Negev Highlands and in the Eilat Mountains.

The Negev shrew is a species of mammal of the family Soricidae that is found only in Israel. A population of the critically endangered Kleinmann's tortoise (also known as the Negev tortoise) survives in the sands of the western and central Negev Desert.

Animals that were reintroduced after their extinction in the wild or localized extinction respectively are the Arabian oryx and the Persian fallow deer. Also introduced was the Asiatic wild ass, which in the Negev counts about 250 animals.

Like many areas in Israel and the rest of the Middle East, the Negev used to host in the distant past the Asiatic lion and the Asiatic cheetah, right until their complete extinction at the hands of humans in later centuries.

Climate
The Negev region is arid (Eilat receives on average only  of rainfall a year), receiving very little rain due to its location to the east of the Sahara (as opposed to the Mediterranean, which lies to the west of Israel), and extreme temperatures due to its location 31 degrees north. However the northernmost areas of the Negev, including Beersheba, are semi-desert. The usual rainfall total from June through October is zero. Snow and frost are rare in the northern Negev, and snow and frost are unknown in the vicinity of Eilat in the southernmost Negev.

History

Prehistorical nomads
Nomadic life in the Negev dates back at least 4,000 years and perhaps as much as 7,000 years.

Bronze Age
The first urbanized settlements were established by a combination of Canaanite, Amalekite, Amorite, Nabataean and Edomite groups circa 2000 BCE. Pharaonic Egypt is credited with introducing copper mining and smelting in both the Negev and the Sinai between 1400 and 1300 BCE.

Biblical

Extent of biblical Negev
According to Israeli archaeologists, in the Hebrew Bible, the term Negev only relates to the northern, semiarid part of what we call Negev today; of this, the Arad-Beersheba Valley, which receives enough rain as to allow agriculture and thus sedentary occupation (the "desert fringe"), is accordingly defined as "the eastern (biblical) Negev".

Biblical reference
According to the Book of Genesis chapter 13, Abraham lived for a while in the Negev after being banished from Egypt. During the Exodus journey to the Promised Land, Moses sent twelve scouts into the Negev to assess the land and population. Later the northern part of biblical Negev was inhabited by the Tribe of Judah and the southern part of biblical Negev by the Tribe of Simeon. The Negev was later part of the Kingdom of Solomon (in its entirety, all the way to the Red Sea), and then, with varied extension to the south, part of the Kingdom of Judah.

Iron Age
In the 9th century BCE, development and expansion of mining in both the Negev and Edom (modern Jordan) coincided with the rise of the Assyrian Empire. Beersheba was the region's capital and a center for trade in the 8th century BCE. Small settlements of Israelites in the areas around the capital existed between 1020 and 928 BCE.

Nabateans and Romans

The 4th-century BCE arrival of the Nabateans resulted in the development of irrigation systems that supported new urban centers located along the Negev incense route at Avdat, Mamshit, Shivta, Haluza (Elusa), and Nitzana. The Nabateans controlled the trade on the spice route between their capital Petra and the Gazan seaports. Nabatean currency and the remains of red and orange potsherds, identified as a trademark of their civilization, have been found along the route, remnants of which are also still visible. Nabatean control of the Negev ended when the Roman empire annexed their lands in 106 CE. The population, largely made up of nomads, although under Roman rule, venerated deities such as Dushara, Allat, and others.

Byzantines
Byzantine rule in the 4th century introduced Christianity to the population. Agriculture-based cities were established and the population grew exponentially.

In January 2021, archaeologists from the Israel Antiquities Authority announced the discovery of tombstone dating back 1,400 years with Greek inscription by an employee of the Parks and Nature Authority at Nitzana National Park. On the Christian woman's stone named Maria these words were written: ‘Blessed Maria who lived immaculate life’.

Early-mid Islamic empires

The southern Negev saw a flourishing of economic activity during the 8th to 10th or 11th centuries. Six Islamic settlements have been found in the vicinity of modern Eilat, along with copper and gold mines and stone quarries, and a sophisticated irrigation system and road network. The economic center was the port of Ayla (Aqaba).

10th–19th century Bedouins

Nomadic tribes ruled the Negev largely independently and with a relative lack of interference for the next thousand years. What is known of this time is largely derived from oral histories and folk tales of tribes from the Wadi Musa and Petra areas in present-day Jordan. The Bedouins of the Negev historically survived chiefly on sheep and goat husbandry. Scarcity of water and of permanent pastoral land required them to move constantly. The Bedouin in years past established few permanent settlements, although some were built, leaving behind remnants of stone houses called 'baika.'

Late Ottoman period (1900–1917)
In 1900, the Ottoman Empire established an administrative center for southern Syria at Beersheba including schools and a railway station. The authority of the tribal chiefs over the region was recognized by the Ottomans.  A railroad connected it to the port of Rafah. In 1914, the Ottoman authorities estimated the nomadic population at 55,000.

British Mandate

The 1916 Sykes-Picot Agreement between Britain and France placed the Negev in Area B, "Arab state or states" under British patronage. The Negev was taken from the Ottoman army by British forces during 1917 and became part of Mandatory Palestine.

In 1922, the Bedouin component of the population was estimated at 72,898 out of a total of 75,254 for the Beersheba sub-district. The 1931 census estimated that the population of the Beersheba sub-district was 51,082. This large decrease was considered to be an artifact of incorrect enumeration methods used in 1922. An Arabic history of tribes around Beersheba, published in 1934 records 23 tribal groups.

State of Israel
Most of the Negev was earmarked by the November 1947 UN Partition Plan for the future Jewish state. During the 1947–49 War of Independence, Israel secured its sovereignty over the Negev. In the early years of the state, it absorbed many of the Jewish refugees from Arab countries, with the Israeli government setting up many development towns, such as Arad, Sderot and Netivot. Since then, the Negev has also become home to many of the Israel Defense Forces' major bases – a process accelerating in the past two decades.

Demography
As of 2010, the Negev was home to some 630,000 people (or 8.2% of Israel's population), even though it comprises over 55% of the country's area. 470,000 Negev residents or 75% of the population of the Negev are Jews, while 160,000 or 25% are Bedouin. Of the Bedouin population (a demographic with a semi-nomadic tradition), half live in unrecognized villages, and half live in towns built for them by the Israeli government between the 1960s and 1980s; the largest of these is Rahat.

The population of the Negev is expected to reach 1.2 million by 2025. It has been projected that the Beersheba metropolitan area will reach a population of 1 million by 2020, and Arad, Yeruham, and Dimona will triple in size by 2025.

Bedouin

A large part of the Negev Bedouins inhabit small communities or villages. Israel has refused to recognize certain Bedouin villages that were founded after the establishment of the state. Under Israel's 2011-adopted and enacted Begin-Prawer plan – officially the Bill on the Arrangement of Bedouin Settlement in the Negev – some Bedouins are being moved to newly created townships. Bedouin villages established after the state without proper approvals are illegal under Israeli law.  They are consequently destroyed or threatened with destruction. An Israeli court ruling in 2017 forced six residents to pay the cost of eight rounds of demolition to the state.

Economy and housing

Development plans

Blueprint Negev is a Jewish National Fund project introduced in 2005. The $600 million project hopes to attract 500,000 new Jewish residents to the Negev by improving transportation infrastructure, establishing businesses, developing water resources and introducing programs to protect the environment. A planned artificial desert river, swimming pools and golf courses raised concerns among environmentalists. Critics oppose those plans, calling instead for an inclusive plan for the green vitalization of existing population centers, investment in Bedouin villages, clean-up of toxic industries and development of job options for the unemployed.

A major Israel Defense Forces training base is being constructed in the Negev to accommodate 10,000 army personnel and 2,500 civilian staff. Three more bases will be built by 2020 as part of a plan to vacate land and buildings in Tel Aviv and central Israel, and bring jobs and investment to the south.

Solar power 

The Negev Desert and the surrounding area, including the Arava Valley, are the sunniest parts of Israel and little of this land is arable, which is why it has become the center of the Israeli solar industry. David Faiman, an expert on solar energy, feels the energy needs of Israel's future could be met by building solar energy plants in the Negev. As director of Ben-Gurion National Solar Energy Center, he operates one of the largest solar dishes in the world.  Technically, however, the Arava is a separate desert with its own unique climate and ecology.

A 250 MW solar park in Ashalim, an area in the northern Negev, the Ashalim Power Station, produces 121 Megawatts of power, using solar mirrors and thermal water heating. It is currently the largest in Israel.

The Rotem Industrial Complex outside of Dimona, Israel, has dozens of solar mirrors that focus the Sun's rays on a tower that in turn heats a water boiler to create steam, turning a turbine to create electricity.  Luz II, Ltd., plans to use the solar array to test new technology for the three new solar plants to be built in California for Pacific Gas and Electric Company.

Wineries

Vines have been planted in the Negev since ancient times. In modern times, vineyards have been established in the northern Negev hills using innovative computerized watering methods for irrigation. Carmel Winery was the first of the major wineries to plant vineyards in the Negev and operates a boutique winery at Ramat Arad. Tishbi has vineyards at Sde Boker and Barkan grows its grapes in Mitzpe Ramon. Yatir Winery is a winery in Tel Arad. Its vineyards are on a hill 900 meters above sea level on the outskirts of Yatir Forest. Carmey Avdat is Israel's first solar-powered winery.

Environmental issues

The Negev is home to hazardous infrastructures that include Negev Nuclear Research Center nuclear reactor, 22 agrochemical and petrochemical factories, an oil terminal, closed military zones, quarries, a toxic waste incinerator at Ne'ot Hovav, cell towers, a power plant, several airports, a prison, and two rivers of open sewage.

The Manufacturers Association of Israel established an authority in 2005 to move 60 industrial enterprises active in the Tel Aviv region to the Negev.

In 1979, the Ramat Hovav toxic waste facility was established in Wadi el-Na'am because the area was perceived as invulnerable to leakage. However, within a decade, cracks were found in the rock beneath Ramat Hovav. In 2004, the Israeli Ministry of Health released Ben Gurion University research findings describing the health problems in a 20 km vicinity of Ramat Hovav. The study, funded in large part by Ramat Hovav, found higher rates of cancer and mortality for the 350,000 people in the area. Prematurely released to the media by an unknown source, the preliminary study was publicly discredited; However, its final conclusions – that Bedouin and Jewish residents near Ramat Hovav are significantly more susceptible than the rest of the population to miscarriages, severe birth defects, and respiratory diseases – passed a peer review several months later.

See also

Caliche
Negev Foundation

References

Explanatory notes

External links

Sde Boker archive of articles on the Negev
Israel's Negev Information Site
Photos of Negev

 
Deserts of Israel
Geography of Southern District (Israel)
Regions of Israel
Hebrew Bible regions
Tourist attractions in Israel